

 
Allandale Station is a locality in the Australian state of South Australia located about  north of the state capital of Adelaide and about  south-east of the town of Oodnadatta.

Allandale Station's boundaries were created on 26 April 2013 and given the “local established name”.  The term ‘Station’ was included in the name to distinguish it from the South Australian localities of Allendale East and Allendale North.  Its boundaries align approximately with the Allandale Station pastoral lease.

The Oodnadatta Track passes through the locality entering in the south-east and exiting in the north-west near Oodnadatta while the Kemp Road, an unsealed road passes through the west side of the locality via Oodnadatta on its way to the Macumba homestead  The Neales River flows from the west through the locality on its way to Lake Eyre in the east. Mount Toondina crater, an impact structure, is located in the locality's south-east.

Land use within the locality is ’primary production’ with the majority of the land being located in the Allandale Station pastoral lease. Allandale Station includes the Algebuckina Bridge, a disused railway bridge which spans the Neales River and which is listed on the South Australian Heritage Register.

The 2016 Australian census which was conducted in August 2016 reports that Allandale Station and other adjoining localities in the north of South Australia shared a population of 204 people of which at least 80 are estimated by the Outback Communities Authority to be living in the locality of Oodnadatta.

Allandale Station is located within the federal division of Grey, the state electoral district of Giles, the Pastoral Unincorporated Area of South Australia and the state government region of the Far North.

Town of Algebuckina
Its site was surveyed in September 1890 in anticipation of the outcome of the discovery of gold in the adjoining area but was not proclaimed until 21 July 1898. The town was never developed and its site remains empty to the present day. The name which was originally used for the now-closed railway station located near the site of the town was derived from the Aboriginal name of a nearby water hole recorded by A. T. Woods in 1872.

References

Notes

Citations

Towns in South Australia
Far North (South Australia)
Places in the unincorporated areas of South Australia